FA Youth Cup Finals from 1970 to 1979.

1978–79: Millwall v. Manchester City (0–0 and 2–0, 2–0 aggregate)

1977–78: Crystal Palace v. Aston Villa (1–0) 

 In 1978, the FA Youth Cup Final was played at Highbury over only one leg.

 Scorer for Crystal Palace; Terry Fenwick.

1976–77: Crystal Palace v. Everton (1–0 aggregate)

 Scorer for Crystal Palace; Terry Fenwick.

1975–76: West Bromwich Albion v. Wolverhampton Wanderers (2–0 and 3–0, 5–0 aggregate)

1974–75: Ipswich Town v. West Ham United (3–1 and 2–0, 5–1 aggregate)

1973–74: Tottenham v. Huddersfield Town (1–1 and 1–0, 2–1 aggregate)

1972–73: Ipswich Town v. Bristol City (3–0 and 1–1, 4–1 aggregate)

1971–72: Aston Villa v. Liverpool (1–0 and 4–2, 5–2 aggregate)

1970–71: Arsenal v. Cardiff City (0–0 and 2–0, 2–0 aggregate)

First leg

Second leg

1969–70: Tottenham Hotspur v. Coventry City (1–0 and 0–1, 1–1 aggregate, replay 2–2 and 2nd replay 1–0)

References

1970s
1969–70 in English football
1970–71 in English football
1971–72 in English football
1972–73 in English football
1973–74 in English football
1974–75 in English football
1975–76 in English football
1976–77 in English football
1977–78 in English football
1978–79 in English football